The 2001 CCHA Men's Ice Hockey Tournament was the 30th CCHA Men's Ice Hockey Tournament. It was played between March 8 and March 17, 2001. First round and play-in games were played at campus sites, while all 'final four' games were played at Joe Louis Arena in Detroit, Michigan. By winning the tournament, Michigan State won the inaugural Mason Cup (named after head coach Ron Mason) and received the Central Collegiate Hockey Association's automatic bid to the 2001 NCAA Division I Men's Ice Hockey Tournament.

Format
The tournament featured four rounds of play. The two teams that finish below tenth place in the standings were not eligible for postseason play. In the First Round, the first and tenth seeds, the second and ninth seeds, the third and eighth seeds, the fourth and seventh seeds and the fifth and sixth seeds played a best-of-three series, with the top three ranked winners advancing to the semifinals and two lower-seeded teams playing in a single play-in game to determine the final qualifier. In the semifinals, the remaining highest and lowest seeds and second highest and second lowest seeds play a single-game, with the winners advancing to the finals. The tournament champion receives an automatic bid to the 2001 NCAA Men's Division I Ice Hockey Tournament.

Conference standings
Note: GP = Games played; W = Wins; L = Losses; T = Ties; PTS = Points; GF = Goals For; GA = Goals Against

Bracket

Note: * denotes overtime period(s)

First round

(1) Michigan State vs. (10) Alaska-Fairbanks

(2) Miami vs. (9) Bowling Green

(3) Michigan vs. (8) Ferris State

(4) Nebraska-Omaha vs. (7) Ohio State

(5) Northern Michigan vs. (6) Western Michigan

Play-In

(5) Northern Michigan vs. (9) Bowling Green

Semifinals

(1) Michigan State vs. (5) Northern Michigan

(3) Michigan vs. (4) Nebraska-Omaha

Championship

(1) Michigan State vs. (3) Michigan

Tournament awards

All-Tournament Team
F Adam Hall (Michigan State)
F Sean Patchell (Michigan State)
F Joe Kautz (Michigan)
D Andrew Hutchinson (Michigan State)
D Dave Huntzkicker (Michigan)
G Ryan Miller* (Michigan State)
* Most Valuable Player(s)

References

External links
2000-01 CCHA Season

CCHA Men's Ice Hockey Tournament
Ccha tournament